Raja Baz Khan of Bratla was the military chief and Vizier for the Nawab of Bahawalpur, Mohammed Bahawal Khan IV who died in 1866 of suspected poisoning. The Nawab was succeeded by his four-year-old son Sadeq Mohammed Khan IV. The Mangrals of Bratla led by Raja Baz Khan administered Bahawalpur and protected the young Nawab during his minority.

Raja Baz Khan built a fort in Bratla which is a replica of the fort he maintained in Bahawalpur. The remains of the Bratla fort still exist.

The Jamia mosque in Bratla was built by Raja Baz Khan and is a replica of the famous Jamia Masjid.

Family
Raja Baz Khan was married to Baaqra Begum the daughter of Raja Madat Khan and died suddenly in Bahawalpur without issue. He lies buried in Bratla alongside Baaqra Begum and his second wife.

References

People from Bahawalpur District
1866 deaths
Year of birth missing
Punjabi people